is a city located in Saitama Prefecture, Japan. , the city had an estimated population of 90,456 in 41,124 households and a population density of 1400 persons per km².

Geography
Higashimatsuyama is located in the geographic center of Saitama Prefecture.

Surrounding municipalities
Saitama Prefecture
 Sakado
 Kumagaya
 Namegawa
 Yoshimi
 Hatoyama
 Kawajima
 Ranzan

Climate
Higashimatsuyama has a Humid subtropical climate (Köppen Cfa) characterized by warm summers and cool winters with light to no snowfall.  The average annual temperature in Higashimatsuyama is 14.5 °C. The average annual rainfall is 1351 mm with September as the wettest month. The temperatures are highest on average in August, at around 26.6 °C, and lowest in January, at around 3.6 °C.

Demographics
Per Japanese census data, the population of Higashimatsuyama has recently plateaued after a long period of growth.

History
Higashimatsuyama developed as a castle town from the Kamakura period, and was ruled as an outlier of Kawagoe Domain (later Maebashi Domain) during the Edo period Tokugawa shogunate.
The town of Matsuyama was established within Hiki District, Saitama with the establishment of the modern municipalities system on April 1, 1889.  Matsuyama merged with the villages of Ooka,  Karako, Takasaka and Nomoto on July 1, 1954, and was elevated to city status as Higashimatsuyama.

Government
Higashimatsuyama has a mayor-council form of government with a directly elected mayor and a unicameral city council of 21 members. Higashimatsuyama, together with the towns of Kawashima and Yoshimi, contributes two members to the Saitama Prefectural Assembly. In terms of national politics, the city is part of Saitama 11th district of the lower house of the Diet of Japan.

Economy
Traditionally the economy of Higashimatsuyama was dominated by sericulture and silk weaving. Modern Higashimatsuyama has several industrial parks with a wide variety of light and medium manufacturing. Due to its geographic location, the city also serves as a bedroom community.

Education

Universities
 Daito Bunka University – Higashimatsuyama campus

Primary and secondary education
 Higashimatsuyama has 11 public elementary schools and five public middle schools operated by the city government, and two public high schools operated by the Saitama Prefectural Board of Education. In addition, there is one private middle school and one private high school. The prefecture also operates one special education school for the handicapped.

Transportation

Railway
 Tobu Railway  – Tobu Railway - Tōbu Tōjō Line
 -

Highway
  – Higashimatsuyama IC, Takasaka SA

Sister cities
 -  Nijmegen, Netherlands since 1996.

Local attractions
 Maruki Gallery for the Hiroshima Panels
Peony Walk Higashimatsuyama
Shobo-ji temple

Noted people from Higshimatsuyama
 Takaaki Kajita (born 1959), Physicist and Nobel Laureate

References

External links

Official Website 

Cities in Saitama Prefecture
Higashimatsuyama, Saitama